Charles Hamilton Leigh Kindersley (23 August 1893 – 8 August 1958) was an English first-class cricketer and British Army officer.

The son of Maitland Fitzroy Kindersley (and great-grandson of Richard Torin Kindersley), he was born at Ferozepore in British India. He was educated in England at Harrow School. He played minor counties cricket for Dorset in 1911 and 1912, making ten appearances in the Minor Counties Championship. Kindsersley served in the British Army during World War I, entering with the rank of second lieutenant. By June 1917, he held the rank of temporary captain in the Dorset Regiment. After the war, Kindersley was seconded to the Royal Hampshire Regiment in 1919.

He later transferred to the British Indian Army, where he served with the permanent rank of captain. While serving in India, he made his debut in first-class cricket for the Europeans against the Hindus at Lahore in March 1928. Days after the conclusion of this match, he played for the Punjab Governor's XI against Northern India. He made a third and final first-class appearance for Northern India against the Indian Army in the 1934–35 Ranji Trophy. He scored 33 runs across his three matches, with a top score of 14. He returned to England at some point after 1934, where he died at Tenterden, Kent, in August 1958, just shy of his 65th birthday.

References

External links

1893 births
1958 deaths
People from Firozpur
People educated at Harrow School
English cricketers
Dorset cricketers
British Army personnel of World War I
Dorset Regiment officers
Royal Hampshire Regiment officers
Europeans cricketers
Northern India cricketers
British Indian Army officers
Charles
Military personnel of British India